Yee Chung-man (奚仲文; born 24 November 1951) is a Hong Kong production designer, art director, costume designer and film director. He was awarded Best Costume and Make Up Design for Curse of the Golden Flower at the 26th Hong Kong Film Awards in 2007.

Filmography as director
 Ocean Heaven (2010)
 And I Hate You So (2000)
 Anna Magdalena (1998)

Awards and nominations
 2006 - Nomination: Academy Award for Best Costume Design for Curse of the Golden Flower 2007 - Awarded: Best Costume and Make Up Design for Curse of the Golden Flower''

References

External links 

Hong Kong film directors
Production designers
Hong Kong art directors
1951 births
Living people
Chinese costume designers